Judge Starr may refer to:

Brantley Starr (born 1979), judge of the United States District Court for the Northern District of Texas
Ken Starr (1946–2022), judge of the United States Court of Appeals for the District of Columbia Circuit
Raymond Wesley Starr (1888–1968), judge of the United States District Court for the Western District of Michigan

See also
Justice Starr (disambiguation)